Martin Vaïsse (born 11 August 1987) is a French tennis player. Vaisse has a career high ATP singles ranking of 225, achieved on 22 September 2014. Vaïsse made his ATP main draw doubles debut at the 2013 Open 13 where he partnered Maxime Chazal but lost in the first round.
At the 2014 Open de Nice Côte d'Azur, Vaïsse qualified for the main draw defeating Ante Pavić, Albert Ramos and Sam Querrey before losing in the first round to compatriot Nicolas Mahut.

External links
 
 

1987 births
Living people
French male tennis players